Mahdi Houryar (born 9 January 1945) is an Iranian wrestler. He competed in the men's Greco-Roman 52 kg at the 1972 Summer Olympics.

References

External links
 

1945 births
Living people
Iranian male sport wrestlers
Olympic wrestlers of Iran
Wrestlers at the 1972 Summer Olympics
Place of birth missing (living people)
20th-century Iranian people